Gatcombe House is a  manor house in Gatcombe on the Isle of Wight, England. The original building was constructed by the Stur (Estur) family as noted in the Domesday Book. St. Olave's Church, built next to the manor to serve as its chapel, was dedicated in 1292. It also belonged at one time to the Lisles of Wootton.

The present stone building stands in hanging woods. It was erected in 1750 by Sir Edward Meux Worsley (c. July 1716 – August 14, 1762), and is typical of the country houses of the time of George III. The manor was afterwards purchased by Alexander Baring, 1st Baron Ashburton. It was later owned by Sir Charles Seely, 1st Baronet. Gatcombe House has been a Grade II*-listed building since July 1951.

References

External links
Gatcombe House entry from The DiCamillo Companion to British & Irish Country Houses

Grade II* listed buildings on the Isle of Wight
Grade II* listed houses
Houses completed in 1750
Manor houses in England
Country houses on the Isle of Wight